Viking Bank is a Russian regional bank with headquarters in Saint-Petersburg. Corporate Name - Commercial Bank "Viking" Closed Joint Stock Company. Viking Bank is a part of Russian Banking System; the Bank's work is governed by the applicable law of the Russian Federation, regulatory acts of the Central Bank of the Russian Federation, and the Charter. General Banking License No. 2 is issued by the State Bank of USSR on August 26, 1988. The Bank functions on the financial market as a universal credit institution.

History

In August 1988, the USSR had begun the period when state banks of industry-specific branches were transformed into the commercial banks. During that period the first private commercial bank - Viking Bank - was established as an experiment (at the beginning the Bank's name was "Patent"). At that time there was no law regulating banking activity and the first Charter of the bank was developed on the basis of the Cooperation Act. Viking Bank was given the General Banking License No.2 on August 26, 1988. License No.1 was given one day before to the Union Bank in Kazakhstan that went bankrupt.

Executives

Victor Halansky – Chairman of the Board of Directors. ScD (Economics), Professor of VAK (Higher Attestation Commission).

Alexey Ustaev – President, ScD (Economics)

Membership

"Saint Petersburg Stock Exchange, CJSC";
"Moscow Interbank Currency Exchange, CJSC";
Russian Banking Association;
Northwest Banking Associations;
International Payment System VISA;
"Northwest Credit History Bureau, CJSC";
System of the compulsory insurance of deposits held by individual persons;
Saint Petersburg commerce and industry chamber;
ROSSWIFT (Russian National SWIFT Association)

Core business areas

Investment financing of the companies in the real sector of economy is a core business area for Viking Bank. 

Viking Bank provides individual persons with package of modern banking products and services. The Bank supports development of regional science, culture and healthcare system. The Bank permanently analyses its clients needs, develops and offers new services, implements modern effective technologies. Individual clients of the Bank can send and receive wire transfers, effect payments to corporate entities, exchange foreign currency, set up accounts in various currencies, control the accounts with the help of Internet-banking, operate bills, use all types of plastic cards and services for storage of funds, jewellery, securities, documentations and other valuable assets in safe deposit boxes, make deposits in roubles and foreign currencies, perform all types of payments.

Social policy

Viking Bank actively participates in various social programmes, assisting vulnerable segments of population, supporting of sports, education and science. 
Charitable programmes of the Bank: financial support of the Ballet and Theatre School named after L.Jacobson, Regional Children's Clinical Hospital, Orphanage No.8, Orphanage No.6, Residential Care Facility for blind and visually impaired children named after K.Grot, Volosovo Orphanage No.1 of the Volosovo District, the Shelter-care Facility "Krokha". 
Since 2007 - Support of the Association of the Chess Federations, Northwest Federal District. This Association unites Chess Federations of 10 Northwest regions and is considered one of the largest chess organisations in Russia. The Bank finances and organizes sports events on various levels - from competitions for children and championships for veterans to large-scale international tournaments where the most prominent chess players take part.
Since 2009 under the patronage of the Bank effectively functions Chess School of the Northwest Federal District.

References

http://www.banki.ru/banks/engbanks/bank/?ID=68751
http://www.cbr.ru/credit/coinfo.asp?id=400000036
http://www.st-petersburg.net/money/banks.htm
http://vikingbank.ru/eng 
http://peterburgbanks.ru/bank-viking.php
http://www.peterburgbanki.ru/banki/bank-viking.html
http://bankir.ru/bank/93379
http://www.spbcci.ru/component/content/article/4033
http://spb-kredit.com/banki-sankt-peterburga/116/

Banks of Russia
Companies based in Saint Petersburg
Russian brands